Galma station is a station of the Daejeon Metro Line 1 in Galma-dong, Seo District, Daejeon, South Korea.

Surroundings 
There are many apartment complexes and residential areas around the station. On the north side of the station are Daejeon Sungryong Elementary School, Daejeon Sungcheon Elementary School, Daejeon Namseon Middle School, Daejeon Gapcheon Middle School and Seodaejeon High School. On the south side are Dunjimi Park, Karma Park, Daejeon Karma Elementary School and Daejeon Dunsan Girls High School.

References

External links
  Galma Station from Daejeon Metropolitan Express Transit Corporation

Daejeon Metro stations
Seo District, Daejeon
Railway stations opened in 2007